Rossi is an Italian surname, said to be the most common surname in Italy. Due to the diaspora, it is also very common in other countries such as Argentina, Brazil, Canada, France, Switzerland, the United States and Uruguay. Rossi is the plural of Rosso (meaning "red (haired)", in Italian).

Variations
Some variations derived from regional traditions and dialects. Other variations derived from medieval scribes spelling names based on how they sounded instead of how they were actually spelled. Recorded variations (in alphabetical order): De Rossi, De Rubeis, De Russi, De Russo, Del Rossi, Del Rosso, Della Rossa, DeRossi, Di Rosso, Di Russo, La Russa, Larussa, Lo Russo, Lorusso, Rossa, Rossato, Rosselini, Rosselino, Rosselli, Rossello, Rossetti, Rossetto, Rossillo, Rossini, Rossit, Rossitti, Rossitto, Rosso, Rossoni, Rossotto, Roussini, Rubiu, Ruggiu, Ruiu, Ruju, Russa, Russello, Russetti, Russi, Russiani, Russino, Russo, and Russotti.

Geographical distribution

Number by country

As of 2014, 63.2% of all known bearers of the surname Rossi were residents of Italy (frequency 1:176), 13.2% of Brazil (1:2,807), 6.7% of the United States (1:9,854), 6.3% of Argentina (1:1,240) and 3.5% of France (1:3,492).

In Italy, the frequency of the surname was higher than national average (1:176) in the following regions:
1. Liguria (1:87)
2. Umbria (1:92)
3. Tuscany (1:96)
4. Emilia-Romagna (1:98)
5. Marche (1:115)
6. Lombardy (1:116)
7. Lazio (1:122)
8. Veneto (1:172)

In Argentina, the frequency of the surname was higher than national average (1:1,240) in the following provinces:
1. Santa Fe Province (1:672)
2. Buenos Aires (1:850)
3. Córdoba Province (1:888)
4. Buenos Aires Province (1:1,026)
5. La Pampa Province (1:1,038)
6. Entre Ríos Province (1:1,233)

In Uruguay, the frequency of the surname was higher than national average (1:1,333) in the following departments:
1. Salto (1:555)
2. Colonia (1:621)
3. Durazno (1:914)
4. Montevideo (1:1,133)
5. Canelones (1:1,171)
6. Paysandú (1:1,244)

In Finland, the frequency of the surname was higher than national average (1:2,251) in the following regions:
1. Central Finland (1:503)
2. South Karelia (1:794)
3. Southern Savonia (1:1,144)
4. Kymenlaakso (1:1,315)
5. Northern Savonia (1:1,595)
 6. Päijänne Tavastia (1:1,949)

In Brazil, the frequency of the surname was higher than national average (1:2,807) in the following states:
1. São Paulo (1:1,173)
2. Paraná (1:1,757)
3. Santa Catarina (1:1,815)
4. Espírito Santo (1:1,855)
5. Rio Grande do Sul (1:1,891)

Notable people

A
Agnes Rossi, American writer
Agustín Rossi, Argentine politician
Agustín Rossi (footballer), Argentine footballer
Aldo Rossi, Italian architect and designer
Alessandra De Rossi, Italian-Filipina actress
Alessandro Rossi (disambiguation), several people
Alessandro Pesenti-Rossi (born 1942), former racing driver from Italy
Alexander Rossi (disambiguation) (multiple people)
Alfredo Rossi (1906–1986), Italian pianist
Anacristina Rossi (born 1952), Costa Rican author
Andrea Rossi (multiple people)
Andrew Rossi, American savant and part-time dunk master
Angela Carlozzi Rossi (1901–1977), American social worker
Angelo Joseph Rossi (1878–1948), U.S. political figure who served as mayor of San Francisco
Anthony T. Rossi, Italian immigrant to the U.S. who founded Tropicana Products
Antonio Rossi (born 1968), Italian canoer
Antonio Rossi (painter) (1700–1773), Italian painter
Antonio Anastasio Rossi (1864–1948), Italian Roman Catholic prelate
Assunta De Rossi (born 1983), Italian-Filipina actress
Azariah dei Rossi (1511–1578), Italian-Jewish physician and scholar

B
Bruno Rossi (1905–1993), physicist

C
Camila Rossi (born 1999), Brazilian rhythmic gymnast
Carlo Rossi (multiple people)
Charles Rossi RA (1762–1839) English sculptor

D
Daniel Rossi (multiple people)
Dino Rossi, former Washington State Senator and Republican

E
Enrico Rossi (multiple people)
Enrico Rossi Chauvenet (born 1984), Italian footballer
Ernesto Rossi (multiple people)

F
Francis Rossi (born 1949), British singer, guitarist and songwriter, member of Status Quo
Francesca Rossi (born 1962), Italian computer scientist
Francesca Rossi (basketball) (born 1968)

G
Gaetano Rossi (1774–1855), writer and opera librettist
George Rossi (1960–2022), Scottish actor in TV series The Bill
Gian Maria Rossi (born 1986), Italian footballer
Giorgia Rossi (born 1987) Italian journalist
Giovanni Antonio de' Rossi (1616–1695), architect
Giovanni Battista de Rossi (1822–1894), archaeologist
Giovanni Rossi (1926–1983), Swiss bicycle racer
Giuseppe Rossi (born 1987), Italian-American footballer
Graziano Rossi (born 1954), Italian motorcycle racer
Gregory Doc Rossi, American musician, composer

H
Hugh Rossi (1927–2020), British politician
Hugo Rossi (born 1935), American mathematician

J
Jorge Rossi Chavarría (1922–2006), Costa Rican politician

K
Kim Rossi Stuart (born 1969), Italian actor, director

L
Lemme Rossi (died 1673), Italian music theorist
Len Rossi (1930–2020), American wrestler
Liane Marcia Rossi, Brazilian chemist
Louis Rossi (born 1989), French motorcycle racer
Lukas Rossi (born 1976), Canadian rock musician and lead singer of Rock Star Supernova
Luigi Rossi (ca. 1597–1653), Italian composer
Luigi Felice Rossi (1805–1863), Italian composer

M
Marcelo Rossi (born 1967), Brazilian Catholic priest
Marco Rossi (multiple people)
Mariarosaria Rossi (born 1972), Italian senator
Mario Rossi (1897–1961), Italian architect
Mario Rossi (1902–1992), Italian conductor
Matías Rossi (born 1984), Argentinian racing driver
Mattia de Rossi (1637–1695), Italian architect of the Baroque period
Melissa Rossi (born 1965), American journalist
Michaël Rossi (born 1988), French racing driver
Michelangelo Rossi (1601–1656), Italian composer
Mino De Rossi (1931–2022), Italian road and track cyclist

N
Néstor Rossi (1925–2007), Argentine football (soccer) player and manager
Nicholas Rossi (born 1987), aka Nicholas Alahverdian
Nicola Rossi-Lemeni (1920–1991), Basso opera singer

P
Paolo Rossi (1956–2020), Italian football striker
Paolo Rossi (footballer, born 1982), Italian footballer
Pasquale de' Rossi (1641–1722), Italian painter
Pellegrino Luigi Odoardo Rossi (1787–1848), Italian economist, politician and jurist
Peter H. Rossi (1921–2006), American sociologist
Pietro Rossi (multiple people)
Portia de Rossi (born 1973), Australian actress
Properzia de' Rossi (1490–1530), Italian sculptor

R
Rachel Rossi (born 1983), American criminal justice lawyer
Reginaldo Rossi (1944–2013), Brazilian singer
Richard Rossi (born 1963), American filmmaker, actor, and writer
Rico Rossi (born 1965), Canadian-Italian ice hockey coach

S
Salamone Rossi (ca. 1570–1630), Italian-Jewish violinist and composer
Sebastiano Rossi (born 1964), Italian footballer
Semino Rossi (born 1962), Argentine-Austrian schlager singer
Sergio Rossi (1935–2020), Italian fashion designer
Shorty Rossi (born 1969), star of the Animal Planet show Pit Boss
Simone Rossi (born 1968), Italian businessman
Steve Rossi (1932–2014), stage name of Joseph Charles Michael Tafarella (1932–2014), American stand-up comedian

T
Teofilo Rossi (1865–1927), Italian lawyer and politician
Teofilo Rossi di Montelera (1902–1991), Italian bobsledder
Theo Rossi (born 1975), American television and film actor
Tino Rossi (1907–1983), Corsican singer and film actor
Tony Rossi (baseball) (born 1943), American college baseball coach

V
Valentino Rossi (born 1979), Italian motorcycle racer
Valeria Rossi (born 1969), Italian singer-songwriter
Vasco Rossi (born 1952), Italian singer-songwriter
Víctor Rossi (born 1943), Uruguayan politician

W
Walter Rossi (1894–1978), sound editor.

Y
Youssef Rossi (born 1973), Moroccan football (soccer) player.

Fictional surnames
SSA David Rossi, protagonist of Criminal Minds
Marco Rossi (Metal Slug), a protagonist of the Metal Slug video game series
Marco Rossi (3000 Leagues in Search of Mother), the main character in 3000 Leagues in Search of Mother
Michael Rossi, a character from the book Peyton Place
Mr. Rossi, an Italian cartoon character

See also
De Rossi
Rossi
Rossa (surname)
Rosso (surname)
Russo (surname)

References

Surnames of South Tyrolean origin
Italian-language surnames
Surnames from nicknames